Pocket Tennis Color is a game from the Pocket Sports series for the Neo Geo Pocket Color handheld game system. It features eight main characters with two secret, unlockable tennis pros.

Reception 

IGN gave the game a rating of 8.0/10. GameSpot thought it was an effective way to kill a bit of time. Hardcore Gamer thought that the mechanics of the game were so " basic, solid and simple" that they would always be appealing to players.

In 2023, Time Extension identified Pocket Tennis Color as one of the best games for the NGPC.

References

External links

1999 video games
Aicom games
Neo Geo Pocket Color games
SNK games
Tennis video games
Video games developed in Japan